The 17th Test and Evaluation Squadron is a United States Space Force test and evaluation unit, located at Schriever Space Force Base, Colorado. The squadron is tasked with testing and evaluating space systems and associated support equipment.

History
On 6 April 1990, at Peterson Air Force Base Colorado the 1017th Test and Evaluation Squadron was activated. The mission of the 1017th was to perform Air Staff-directed initial and follow-on operational test and evaluation of Air Force Space Command (AFSPC) space surveillance, missile warning, and command and control systems.  The squadron oversaw two operating locations at Falcon Air Force Base and Buckley Air National Guard Base.  The unit inactivated on 15 October 1992.

On 12 July 1995, the unit reactivated as the 17th Test Squadron. Operating Location A was activated at Cheyenne Mountain Air Force Station, Colorado.

The stand-up ceremony was held on Friday, 21 July 1996, in the Presentation Center of the Joint National Test Facility at 1300. The special guests included Col Burkhart, the 50th Space Wing Vice Commander; Col Deese, the AFSPC Comptroller; Col Kingsberry, from the AFSPC Division of Space Control; Col Mercier, Commander of Detachment 4 of the Air Force Operational Test and Evaluation Center; and Col Springer, from AFSPC Division of Training and Standardization. After the reading of the activation orders, the 17th's guidon was unsheathed, symbolizing the activation of a new USAF squadron. Then the guidon was passed to Col Howard J. Fry, the Commander of the Space Warfare Center and the presiding officer for the stand-up. Colonel Fry passed the guidon to Lt Col Carl Cox, the first Commander of the 17th, signifying the passing of all legal and operational responsibilities. At the formation of the squadron, manning was at just over ten people.

On 1 April 2013 the 17th Test Squadron was transferred to Air Combat Command under the 53d Wing, located at Eglin Air Force Base, Florida, which serves as the focal point for the Combat Air Forces in electronic warfare, armament and avionics, chemical defense, reconnaissance, and aircrew training devices. The wing reports to the Air Warfare Center at Nellis Air Force Base, Nevada. The wing is also responsible for operational testing and evaluation of new equipment and systems proposed for use by these forces.

On 7 August 2020 the 17th Test Squadron was transferred to the United States Space Force under Space Training and Readiness Delta (Provisional), Space Operations Command.

On 20 August 2021 the 17th Test Squadron was reassigned from Space Operations Command to Space Training and Readiness Command and further assigned to Space Delta 12 and redesignated the 17th Test and Evaluation Squadron.

Lineage
 Designated as the 1017th Test and Evaluation Squadron and activated on 6 April 1990
 Inactivated on 15 October 1992
 Redesignated 17th Test Squadron on 30 June 1995
 Activated on 21 July 1995
 Redisignated 17th Test and Evaluation Squadron on 20 August 2021

Assignments
 Air Force Space Command, 6 April 1990 – 15 October 1992
 Space Warfare Center, 21 July 1995
 595th Test and Evaluation Group (later 595th Space Group), 7 April 2000
 53d Test Management Group, 1 April 2013 – 7 August 2020 
 Space Training and Readiness Delta (Provisional), Space Operations Command, August 7, 2020 - August 20, 2021.
 Space Delta 12, Space Training and Readiness Command, August 20, 2021 - Present.

Components
 Detachment 1: Buckley Space Force Base, Colorado

Stations
 Peterson Air Force Base, Colorado, 6 April 1990 - 15 October 1992
 Falcon Air Force Base (later Schriever Space Force Base), Colorado, 21 July 1995 - 5 June 1998
 Schriever Air Force Base, Colorado, June 5, 1998 - July 26, 2021
 Schriever Space Force Base, Colorado, July 26, 2021 - Present

Decorations

List of commanders

 Lt Col Teddy N. Wang, 6 April 1990 - unknown
 Lt Col Carl L. Cox, 21 July 1995 
 Lt Col Wyatt C. Miller, 17 October 1997 
 Lt Col Mark A. Johnson, 2 December 1998 
 Lt Col James O'Neal, Jr., 5 December 2000
 Lt Col Richard W. Boltz, 17 March 2003
 Lt Col Scott J. Hower, 27 June 2005
 Lt Col Edward T. Ackerman, 8 June 2007
 Lt Col Peter J. Flores, 17 June 2009
 Lt Col Gregory Wood, 17 June 2011
 Lt Col Todd Bridges
 Lt Col David R. Morrow, June 2015 – June 2017
 Lt Col Adam Fisher, 8 July 2017
 Lt Col Sacha Tomlinson, 2017-2019
 Lt Col Robert C. McConnell, 2021
 Lt Col Christopher W. McLeod, 8 June 2021

See also
14th Test Squadron - Air Force Reserve associate of the 17th Test Squadron

References 

Squadrons of the United States Space Force
Military units and formations in Colorado